Elisabethatriene synthase (EC 4.2.3.41, elisabethatriene cyclase) is an enzyme with systematic name geranylgeranyl-diphosphate diphosphate-lyase (elisabethatriene-forming). This enzyme catalyses the following chemical reaction

 geranylgeranyl diphosphate  elisabethatriene + diphosphate

This enzyme requires Mg2+ or less efficiently Mn2+.

References

External links 
 

EC 4.2.3